This is a list of members of the Senate of Canada in the 28th Parliament of Canada.

The province of Quebec has 24 Senate divisions which are constitutionally mandated. In all other provinces, a Senate division is strictly an optional designation of the senator's own choosing, and has no real constitutional or legal standing. A senator who does not choose a special senate division is designated a senator for the province at large.

Names in bold indicate senators in the 20th Canadian Ministry.

List of senators

Senators at the beginning of the 28th Parliament

Senators appointed during the 28th Parliament

Left Senate during the 28th Parliament

Changes in party affiliation during the 28th Parliament

See also
List of current Canadian senators

References

28
28th Canadian Parliament